Botanical gardens in Bangladesh have collections consisting entirely of Bangladesh native and endemic species; most have a collection that include plants from around the world. There are botanical gardens and arboreta in all states and territories of Bangladesh, most are administered by local governments, some are privately owned.

 National Botanical Garden of Bangladesh, Mirpur, Dhaka
 Baldha Garden. Wari, Dhaka
 Botanical Garden and Eco-Park, Sitakunda, Chittagong

References 

Bangladesh
Botanical gardens